Heinz Behrens (30 September 1932 – 9 August 2022) was a German actor. He gained notoriety in the GDR primarily through the portrayal of Horst Baumann in the DFF comedy series Maxe Baumann and in the role of Karl-Heinz in the 20-part series Rentner haben niemals Zeit.

Select filmography
KLK Calling PTZ – The Red Orchestra
Bürgschaft für ein Jahr
Du bist nicht allein

References

External links
 
 

1932 births
2022 deaths
20th-century German male actors
21st-century German male actors
People from the Province of Lower Silesia
People from Zielona Góra